Agia Kyriaki (Agía Kyriakí) may refer to several places in Greece named after Saint Kyriaki:

Agia Kyriaki, an island in the Dodecanese
Agia Kyriaki, Elis, a village in the Elis regional unit, part of the municipal unit Lasiona
Agia Kyriaki, Kastoria, a village in the Kastoria regional unit, part of the municipal unit Mesopotamia
Agia Kyriaki, Kozani, a village in the Kozani regional unit, part of the municipal unit Velventos
Agia Kyriaki, Magnesia, a village and small port in the municipal unit of Trikeri
Agia Kyriaki, Thesprotia, a village in Thesprotia, part of the municipal unit Paramythia
Agia Kyriaki, Trikala, a village in the Trikala regional unit, part of the municipal unit Megala Kalyvia

See also 
 Kyriaki, a village in Boeotia